The Devil's Delusion: Atheism and Its Scientific Pretensions is a 2008 book by David Berlinski. It discusses atheism and religion, defending the religious point of view.

Summary
In summary, he asserts that some skeptical arguments against religious belief based on scientific evidence misrepresent what the science is actually saying, that an objective morality requires a religious foundation, that mathematical theories attempting to bring together quantum mechanics and the theory of relativity amount to pseudoscience because of their lack of empirical verifiability, and he expresses doubt towards Darwinian evolutionary theory

Reception
A review stated: "Berlinski’s biography and book raises at least two questions: first, given the book’s powerful arguments in favor of religious belief, why is the author not religious? And second, given that the author is not religious, doesn’t this spirited defense of religion deserve an honest hearing?"

Writing in Touchstone magazine, Matthew Dowling said: "The Devil's Delusion is appropriate for the pastor and scholar, and for all those who are interested in an academic's response to the New Atheism. Berlinski's writing is well informed, pointed, and highly entertaining."

Citations

Further reading

External links 
 

2009 non-fiction books
Criticism of atheism
Books about atheism